Panormus or  Panormos was a small port town of ancient Caria, on the peninsula of Halicarnassus, 80 stadia to the northeast of Myndus. It is no doubt the same port which Thucydides calls Πάνορμος τῆς Μιλησίας.

Its site is located near the modern Paşa Liman.

References

Populated places in ancient Caria
Former populated places in Turkey